Vantage Hospitality Group Inc. was an American hotel corporation, operating hotels in the United States and internationally. Its brands include Best Value Inn and Lexington by Vantage. In 2016, Vantage Hospitality Group was acquired by Red Lion Hotels Corp.

History

Vantage Hospitality Group was founded in 1999 and had over 1,000 properties around the U.S. and Canada by 2016. By 2016, Vantage Hospitality operated 10 brands, including Best Value Inn and Value Inn Worldwide.

America's Best Value Inn received a Hotel Vikas diamond award in 2010 in the Best Hotel Franchisor category. Hotel Vikas is a trade publication targeted to hotel CEOs.

In 2005, Vantage introduced the Lexington by Vantage brand.

In 2014, Vantage acquired America's Best Franchising and its brands: America's Best Inns & Suites, Country Hearth Inns & Suites, Jameson Inn, Signature Inn, and 3 Palms Hotels and Resorts. As part of the acquisition, Vantage plans to restart the Signature Inn chain, which is inactive.

On September 14, 2016 Red Lion Hotels announced it was acquiring Vantage for $23 million.

Brands

United States

 America's Best Inns: A chain of economy hotels. Vantage plans to eliminate this brand, with most properties transitioning into America's Best Value Inns.
 America's Best Value Inns: Mid-economy hotels with over 1,000 locations nationwide.
 Country Hearth Inns & Suites: An upper-economy and lower midscale brand. Country Hearth Inns feature rooms, suites, and a complementary breakfast.
 Jameson Inn: A midscale chain operating primarily in the Southern United States.
 Lexington Hotels & Inns: A collection of mid-scale and upscale inns, suites, and resorts. Typical Lexington properties feature on-site dining, business centers, and fitness centers. Many Lexington properties are brand conversions, but the chain has begun building new properties.
 3 Palms Hotels & Resorts: A small chain of hotels and resorts.

International
 Canada's Best Value Inns A chain of economy properties located across Canada.
Value Inns Worldwide  A chain of economy properties located across the world

Brands under development
 Signature Inn:  Vantage plans to re-launch the inactive Signature brand as a budget chain, with newly constructed properties.

Programs
Vantage offers two loyalty programs for its guests.

Value Club Program
Guests at America's Best Value Inn and Canada's Best Value Inn properties are eligible to sign up for a Value Club Card, which entitles them to 15% off of Best Value Inn stays, plus additional discounts from partners.

Lexington Rewards
Vantage's Lexington properties participate in the Voilà Hotel Rewards program. Participants receive points and other benefits.

America's Best Franchising
(Not to be confused with America's Best Value Inn)

America's Best Franchising, based in Atlanta, Georgia, was an American lodging company. Its brands comprised America's Best Inn, Country Hearth Inns & Suites, Jameson Inn, 3 Palms Hotel, Parkside Hotels, and Budgetel. Of the brands, America's Best Inn was founded in Marion, Illinois, The Budgetel name is a revival of a brand which was renamed Baymont Inn & Suites. Country Hearth opened its first location in 1983 as Homeplace Inn in Angleton, Texas.

Budgetel Franchise System  is an American-based hotel franchiser to United States and Canada.  The current Budgetel was established in Atlanta, Georgia in 2007 by brothers Mike and R. C. Patel who bought the brand from Blackstone Group.  In 2009, America's Best Franchising, Inc. began franchising the brand.

In 2014, America's Best Franchising was acquired by Vantage Hospitality. All ABF brands are now part of Vantage with the exception of Budgetel, which is part of Hospitality Lodging Systems.

References

External links

Vantage Hospitality Group
America's Best Value Inn
The Lexington Collection
America's Best Franchising

Companies based in Broward County, Florida
Coral Springs, Florida
Hotel chains in the United States
Hospitality companies established in 1999
American companies established in 1999
2016 mergers and acquisitions
Red Lion Hotels Corporation
Defunct hotel chains